"Thanks a Lot" is a song originally recorded by Johnny Cash. It was written for him by Charlie Rich.

The song was recorded by Cash on July 10, 1958 during his final sessions for Sun Records. It would be released as a single (Sun 316, with "Luther Played the Boogie", another song from the same session, on the opposite side) on February 15 of the next year, when he already left the label for Columbia.

Before that, the song appeared on Sun Records' album Greatest! Johnny Cash, that came out in January 1959.

Cash would receive a BMI award for this single.

Composition

Charts

Covers 
 1979: Ernest Tubb and Loretta Lynn — Cachet Records 12" vinyl, track 3

References 

Johnny Cash songs
1959 singles
Songs written by Charlie Rich
Sun Records singles
1959 songs